The Uzboi-Landon-Morava (ULM) outflow system is a long series of channels and depressions that may have carried water across a major part of Mars.  It starts with channels that drain into the Argyre basin in the Argyre quadrangle.  Water ponded in the Argyre basin, then the overflow is believed to have traveled northward through Uzboi Vallis, into Landon basin, through Morava Valles, to the floor of Margaritifer basin. Some of the water may have helped to carve Ares Vallis.  Altogether, the total area drained for this watershed may have been about 11 X 106 km2 or about 9% of Mars.

Pictures below show the Argyre basin which was once full of water.  Also, the wider view shows the distance the water traveled, which was south of Argyre basin to Margaritifer Terra.

Gallery

See also

References

Valleys and canyons on Mars
Margaritifer Sinus quadrangle
Argyre quadrangle